The Chatham Stakes is a registered Victoria Racing Club Group 3 Thoroughbred open handicap horse race raced as the Paramount+ Chatham Stakes, over a distance of 1400 metres held annually at Flemington Racecourse, Melbourne, Australia during the VRC Spring Racing Carnival.  Total prize money for the race is A$200,000 and $1,500 trophy.

History

The registered race is named after Australian Racing Hall of Fame and 1930s dual Cox Plate winner, Chatham.

The race has been run on the last day of the Flemington Carnival, Mackinnon Stakes day since 2018. Prior to 1997 the race was scheduled on Melbourne Cup Day. The race was then run on the first day of the Spring Carnival, Victoria Derby day between 1998 and 2015, before moving to Oaks Day between 2016 and 2017.

Name
Melbourne Cup Day
1978–1993  -   The Great Western 
1994–1996 - Royal Hong Kong Jockey Club Plate

Victoria Derby Day
1997–2005 - Yallambee Stud Stakes  
2006  -   Helvetica Stakes 
2007  -   Ellerston Capital Stakes     
2008–2010  -   AAMI Business Insurance Chatham Stakes     
2011–2013   -   tab.com.au Stakes
2014 - Yellowglen Stakes
2015 - Guvera Stakes
2022 - Paramount+ Rising Fast Stakes

VRC Oaks Day
2016 -  L'Oreal Stakes
2017 - TCL TV Stakes

LKS Mackinnon Stakes Day
2018 - DeRUCCI Chatham Stakes
2019–2020 - Network Ten Chatham Stakes
2021–current - Paramount+ Chatham Stakes

Grade
 1978–1985 - Listed Race
 1986 onwards - Group 3

Distance
 1978–1985 - 1600 metres
 1986 onwards - 1400 metres

Winners

 2022 - Argentia
 2021 - Age Of Chivalry
 2020 - Sansom
 2019 - Reykjavik
 2018 - Dreamforce
 2017 - Hellova Street
 2016 - Rageese
 2015 - Disposition
 2014 - Hucklebuck
 2013 - Smokin' Joey
 2012 - Fawkner
 2011 - Woorim
 2010 - Poor Judge
 2009 - Centennial Park
 2008 - All Silent
 2007 - Count To Zero
 2006 - Malcolm
 2005 - Rockford Bay
 2004 - Great Is Great
 2003 - Scenic Park
 2002 - To Be Fair
 2001 - Scenic Park
 2000 - Matter Of Honour
 1999 - Black Bean
 1998 - Bezeal Bay
 1997 - Confiscate
 1996 - Headstrong
 1995 - Final Temp
 1994 - New Smyrna
 1993 - Cocky Beau
 1992 - Let's Hurry
 1991 - Blue Boss
 1990 - Power Of Destiny
 1989 - Swiftsynd
 1988 - Bowie
 1987 - Targlish
 1986 - Avannotto
 1985 - Beaumont Babe
 1984 - La Caissiere
 1983 - Vivacite
 1982 - Pride Of Century
 1981 - Lloyd's Race
 1980 - Black Marque
 1979 - Blue And White
 1978 - Sarsha's Choice

See also
 List of Australian Group races
 Group races

References

Horse races in Australia